"Hate the Other Side" is a song by American rapper Juice Wrld and American producer Marshmello featuring American rapper Polo G and Australian rapper the Kid Laroi, released on July 10, 2020, as the ninth track from Juice's posthumous third studio album Legends Never Die.

Composition
Marshmello handles the guitar-driven production, followed by, as noted by Billboards Michael Saponara, a "four-lane highway" for Juice, his protégé the Kid Laroi, and Polo G to drift into the abyss. Built around Juice's heartbreaking chorus, he gets candid about the pain from "trying to balance the love for those closest to him and securing the bag".

Visualizer
In the visualizer, the artist David Garibaldi appears painting portraits of Juice Wrld, Marshmello, the Kid Laroi and Polo G. The visualizer was directed by Ricky Yee.

Chart performance
The song debuted and peaked at number ten on the Billboard Hot 100, being Juice Wrld's eighth and Marshmello's third top ten entry; it also became Polo G and Laroi's highest charting song. It also debuted and peaked at number 12 in Canada and number 15 in Australia.

Credits and personnel
Credits adapted from Tidal.
 Jarad Higgins – vocals, songwriting, composition
 Marshmello – songwriting, composition, production
 Charlton Howard – vocals, songwriting, composition
 Taurus Bartlett – vocals, songwriting, composition, remixing, studio personnel
 Nyles Hollowell-Dhar – songwriting, composition
 David Lynn Moody – songwriting, composition
 Manny Marroquin - mixing, studio personnel
 Chris Galland – mixing assistance, studio personnel
 Jeremie Inhaber – mixing assistance, studio personnel
 Robin Florent – mixing assistance, studio personnel
 Max Lord - engineer, studio personnel
 Tatsuya Sato - mastering, studio personnel

Charts

Weekly charts

Year-end charts

Certifications

References

2020 songs
Juice Wrld songs
Marshmello songs
Polo G songs
The Kid Laroi songs
Songs written by Juice Wrld
Songs written by Marshmello
Songs written by Kshmr
Songs written by the Kid Laroi
Songs released posthumously
Songs written by Polo G